The 1940 Harvard Crimson football team was an American football team that represented Harvard University as an independent during the 1940 college football season. In its sixth season under head coach Dick Harlow, the team compiled a 3–2–3 record and outscored opponents by a total of 77 to 49. The team played its home games at Harvard Stadium in Boston.

Schedule

References

Harvard
Harvard Crimson football seasons
Harvard Crimson football
1940s in Boston